Datuk Joseph Salang Gandum (born 1 January 1951) is a Malaysian politician and former bank officer who served as the Deputy Minister of Information, Communications and Culture, Deputy Minister of Energy, Water and Communications and Deputy Minister of Foreign Affairs in the Barisan Nasional (BN) administration under former Prime Ministers Abdullah Ahmad Badawi, Najib Razak and former Ministers Rais Yatim, Shaziman Abu Mansor and Syed Hamid Albar from March 2004 to May 2013 as well as the Member of Parliament (MP) for Julau from November 1999 to May 2018. He is a member of the Parti Rakyat Sarawak (PRS), a component party of the ruling Gabungan Parti Sarawak (GPS) and formerly BN coalitions and was a member of the Parti Bansa Dayak Sarawak (PBDS), also a component party of the BN coalition. He has served as the 2nd President of PRS since October 2021, when he has served in official capacity since April 2022 and in acting capacity from October 2021 to April 2022. He also served as the Deputy President of PRS from October 2018 to his official promotion to the party presidency in April 2022 and Secretary-General of PRS from October 2016 to his promotion to party deputy presidency in October 2018. He was also Vice President of PRS.

Salang was a bank officer before entering politics. He was elected to Parliament in the 1999 election. He was originally a member (and deputy president) of the Sarawak Native People's Party (PBDS), but sat in Parliament without a party after the PBDS was deregistered in 2004. He eventually joined the PRS ahead of the 2008 election.

Salang has served in a number of government posts, including Deputy Minister of Foreign Affairs, Deputy Minister of Energy, Water and Communications, and Deputy Minister of Information, Communications and Culture. He turned down reappointment to the deputy ministry after the 2013 election.

Election results

Honours
  :
  Member of the Order of the Defender of the Realm (AMN) (2000)
  :
  Officer of the Order of the Defender of State (DSPN) - Datuk (2003)
  :
  Commander of the Order of the Star of Hornbill Sarawak (PGBK) - Datuk (2012)

References

Living people
1951 births
People from Sarawak
Iban people
Parti Rakyat Sarawak politicians
Parti Bansa Dayak Sarawak politicians
Members of the Dewan Rakyat
Members of the Order of the Defender of the Realm
Commanders of the Order of the Star of Hornbill Sarawak
21st-century Malaysian politicians